SpongeBob's Surf & Skate Roadtrip is a SpongeBob SquarePants video game based on SpongeBob's Runaway Roadtrip. The video game was developed by Blitz Games on Xbox 360 and Sabarasa Inc. on Nintendo DS and published by THQ. It is available for Nintendo DS and Xbox 360. It is the first SpongeBob game on Xbox to use Kinect. It was also the final Nickelodeon game published by THQ.

Plot
In Story Mode, SpongeBob and Patrick relive their crazy road trip to the beach through some slideshows leading into arcade-style play. In Challenge Mode, a player can do freestyle and explore a new never-before-seen world in Bikini Bottom.

Reception
The game has received mixed reviews. Andrew Hayward of the Official Xbox Magazine reviewed the video game and wrote "Surf & Skate Roadtrip remains a decent Kinect pick for a few hours of amusement, especially for young SpongeBob fans." Mike of the 123Kinect.com gave the video game a 5/10 rating based on 123 reviews. He wrote "If you or your kids are fine with the foot deal, then its really a mediocre game, may give them something to do for a day or two but that will probably be it. I'd wait until it's in the bargain bin if you must have it." Common Sense Media review of this video game stated that the game is fun but forgettable.

See also
List of SpongeBob SquarePants merchandise

References

2011 video games
Kinect games
Multiple-sport video games
Nintendo DS games
Skateboarding video games
Surfing video games
THQ games
SpongeBob SquarePants video games
Video games developed in the United Kingdom
Xbox 360 games
Blitz Games Studios games
Multiplayer and single-player video games